Image Institute of Technology & Management (IITM), Cuttack is an authorized Learning Center of Punjab Technical University (PTU) offering UGC Recognized IT & Management Degree programs. The institute is a trust registered Under Indian Trust Act 1882. The basic objective of the trust is "to develop managerial and intellectual skill among the youths of the nation by creating institutional networks" and thus "further the overall socio- economic development of the  country."

References

External links
 Image Institute of Technology & Management Site

Universities and colleges in Odisha
Education in Cuttack
Business schools in Odisha
Educational institutions established in 2001
2001 establishments in Orissa